Rockwell is a census-designated place (CDP) in Garland County, Arkansas, United States. The population was 3,780 at the 2010 census.

Geography
Rockwell is located at  (34.464348, -93.133816).

Demographics

2020 census

As of the 2020 United States census, there were 4,548 people, 1,910 households, and 1,287 families residing in the CDP.

2000 census
As of the census of 2000, there were 3,024 people, 1,274 households, and 931 families residing in the CDP. The racial makeup of the CDP was 97.12% White, 0.83% Black or African American, 0.40% Native American, 0.26% Asian, 0.13% from other races, and 1.26% from two or more races.  0.86% of the population were Hispanic or Latino of any race.

There were 1,274 households, out of which 27.1% had children under the age of 18 living with them, 61.7% were married couples living together, 8.6% had a female householder with no husband present, and 26.9% were non-families. 23.2% of all households were made up of individuals, and 10.6% had someone living alone who was 65 years of age or older.  The average household size was 2.37 and the average family size was 2.77.

In the CDP, the population was spread out, with 21.2% under the age of 18, 5.0% from 18 to 24, 26.4% from 25 to 44, 28.9% from 45 to 64, and 18.4% who were 65 years of age or older.  The median age was 43 years. For every 100 females, there were 94.8 males.  For every 100 females age 18 and over, there were 90.9 males.

The median income for a household in the CDP was $46,366, and the median income for a family was $53,241. Males had a median income of $39,175 versus $30,035 for females. The per capita income for the CDP was $24,647.  About 2.7% of families and 4.5% of the population were below the poverty line, including 5.6% of those under age 18 and 1.4% of those age 65 or over.

Education
It is in the Lake Hamilton School District.

References

Census-designated places in Garland County, Arkansas
Census-designated places in Arkansas